The Ramnulfids, or the House of Poitiers, were a French dynasty ruling the County of Poitou and Duchy of Aquitaine in the 9th through 12th centuries. Their power base shifted from Toulouse to Poitou. In the early 10th century, they contested the dominance of northern Aquitaine and the ducal title to the whole with the House of Auvergne. In 1032, they inherited the Duchy of Gascony,  thus uniting it with Aquitaine. By the end of the 11th century, they were the dominant power in the southwestern third of France. The founder of the family was Ramnulf I, who became count in 835.

Ramnulf's son, Ramnulf II, claimed the title of King of Aquitaine in 888, but it did not survive him. Through his illegitimate son Ebalus he fathered the line of dukes of Aquitaine that would rule continuously from 927 to 1204, from the succession of William III to the death of Eleanor, who brought the Ramnulfid inheritance first to Louis VII of France and then to Henry II of England.

Several daughters of this house achieved high status. Adelaide married Hugh Capet and was thus the first Queen of France in the era of the Direct Capetians. Agnes married Henry III, Holy Roman Emperor, and ruled as regent for her son, the young Henry IV. The most illustrious woman was certainly Aquitaine's ruler Eleanor, whose marriage to Henry II of England crafted the Angevin Empire which was to cause so much discord between France and England.

The Ramnulfid house did much to encourage art, literature, and piety. Under William V, William IX, and William X, Aquitaine became the centre for the art of poetry and song in the vernacular; the troubadour tradition was born and raised there. The Peace and Truce of God were fostered and the ideal of courtly love invented.

Counts of Poitiers and Dukes of Aquitaine
The House of Poitiers produced many Dukes of Aquitaine, who were officially titled Counts of Poitiers. This line became extinct in the male-line in 1137, and in the female-line in 1204 with the death of Eleanor of Aquitaine, who was by her first marriage Queen of France, and by her second marriage, Queen of England.

Princes of Antioch and Counts of Tripoli
A branch of the House of Poitiers settled in the Holy Land, founded by Raymond of Poitiers (1115-1149), a younger son of William IX of Aquitaine, from whom descended the last princes of Antioch and counts of Tripoli.

 1163-1201: Bohemond III († 1201), prince of Antioch, son of Raymond of Poitiers and Constance of Antioch.
 1201-1216: Bohemond IV (1172 † 1233), prince of Antioch and count of Tripoli, second son of Bohemond III and Orgueilleuse d'Harenc.
 1216-1219: Raymond-Roupen (1199 † 1221), son of Raymond IV, Count of Tripoli, (eldest son of Bohemond III and Orgueilleuse d'Harenc) and Alice of Armenia.
 1219-1233: Bohemond IV, restored.
 1233-1252: Bohemond V († 1252), prince of Antioch and count of Tripoli, son of Bohemond IV and Plaisance of Gibelet.
 1252-1268: Bohemond VI the Fair (1237 † 1275), prince of Antioch and count of Tripoli, son of Bohemond V and Luciana de Caccamo-Segni. The city of Antioch was definitively lost in 1268, but Bohemond VI retained the title of Prince of Antioch until his death and passed it on to his descendants in the House of Poitiers.
 1275-1287: Bohemond VII († 1287), prince of Antioch and count of Tripoli, son of preceding.
 1287-1299: Lucia († 1299), princess of Antioch and countess of Tripoli, sister of preceding, married Narjot de Toucy, Sicilian admiral.

Kings of Cyprus
Henry of Antioch (d. 1276), son of Bohemond IV of Antioch, married Isabella of Lusignan (d. 1264), heiress of the kingdom of Cyprus, and thus founded the second House of Lusignan. The lineage of the House of Poitiers became extinct in 1487 with the death of Queen Charlotte of Cyprus.

 1267-1284: Hugh III (1235 † 1284), King of Cyprus and Jerusalem, son of Henry of Antioch and Isabella of Lusignan.
 1284-1285: John II (1267 † 1285), King of Cyprus and Jerusalem, son of Hugues III and of Isabella of Ibelin.
 1285-1306: Henry II (1271 † 1324), King of Cyprus, son of Hugues III and of Isabelle of Ibelin.
 1306-1310: Amalric, Prince of Tyre (1272 † 1310), governor of Cyprus, son of Hugh III and of Isabella of Ibelin.
 1310-1324: Henry II of Jerusalem.
 1324-1359: Hugh IV (1295 † 1359), King of Cyprus, son of Guy of Cyprus (son of Hugh III and Isabella of Ibelin) and of Echive of Ibelin.
 1359-1369: Peter I (1328 † 1369), King of Cyprus, son of Hugh IV and of Alix of Ibelin.
 1369-1382: Peter II (1357 † 1382), King of Cyprus, son of Peter I and of Eleanor of Aragon.
 1382-1398: James I (1334 † 1398), King of Cyprus, son of Hugh IV and of Alix of Ibelin.
 1398-1432: Janus (1375 † 1432), King of Cyprus, son of James I and of Helvis of Brunswick-Grubenhagen.
 1432-1458: John II (1418 † 1458), King of Cyprus, son of Janus and Charlotte de Bourbon.
 1458-1464: Charlotte (1442 † 1487), Queen of Cyprus, daughter of John II and of Helena Palaiologina.
 1464-1473: James II, the Bastard (1418 † 1473), King of Cyprus, illegitimate son of John II and Marietta de Patras.
 1473-1474: James III, the Posthumous (1473 † 1474), son of James II and Catherine Cornaro.

Genealogy

House of Poitiers

 Ranulf I of Aquitaine
 Ranulf II of Aquitaine
 Ranulf III of Aquitaine
  Ebalus, Duke of Aquitaine (illegitimate)
 William III, Duke of Aquitaine
  William IV, Duke of Aquitaine
 William V, Duke of Aquitaine
 William VI, Duke of Aquitaine
 Odo of Gascony
 Theobald
 Peter William, later William VII, Duke of Aquitaine
  Guy Geoffrey, later William VIII, Duke of Aquitaine
 William IX, Duke of Aquitaine
 William X, Duke of Aquitaine
 Eleanor of Aquitaine
  William Aigret
  Raymond of Poitiers, Prince of Antioch
  House of Poitiers-Antioch
  Hugh
  Ebles
  Ebalus, Bishop of Limoges and Treasurer of St. Hilary of Poitiers
 Gauzbert
  Ebalus, Chancellor of France

House of Poitiers-Antioch

 Raymond of Poitiers, Prince of Antioch
 Bohemond III of Antioch
 Raymond IV, Count of Tripoli
  Raymond-Roupen
 Bohemond IV of Antioch
 Raimond de Poitiers, Bailiff of Antioch
 Bohemond V of Antioch
  Bohemond VI of Antioch
  Bohemond VII, Count of Tripoli
  Henry of Antioch
  House of Poitiers-Lusignan
 Manuel de Poitiers
 Guillaume de Poitiers
  Bohemond de Poitiers, Lord Consort of Boutron
 Jean de Boutron
 Guillaume de Boutron, Lord of Boutron, Constable of Jerusalem
  Jean de Boutron, Lord of Boutron
  Jacques de Boutron
 Rostain de Boutron, Lord of Boutron
  Guillaume de Boutron
 Baldwin
  Raymond

House of Poitiers-Lusignan

 Henry of Antioch
  Hugh III of Cyprus
 John I of Cyprus
 Bohemond of Lusignan
 Henry II of Jerusalem
 Amalric, Prince of Tyre
 Hugh of Lusignan, Lord of Crusoche
 Henry of Lusignan
 Guy of Lusignan, later Constantine II, King of Armenia
 John of Lusignan, Constable and Regent of Cilicia
 Bohemond of Lusignan
  Leo V, King of Armenia (illegitimate)
  Bohemond of Lusignan
  Barthelemy of Lusignan, Co-Regent of Armenia (illegitimate)
 Aimery of Lusignan, Constable of Cyprus
  Guy of Lusignan
  Hugh IV of Cyprus
 Guy of Lusignan, Constable of Cyprus and Titular Prince of Galilee
  Hugh of Lusignan, Titular Prince of Galilee, Senator of Rome
 Peter I of Cyprus
  Peter II of Cyprus
 John of Lusignan
 James of Lusignan, Titular Count of Tripoli
 John of Lusignan, Titular Count of Tripoli
  Peter of Lusignan, Titular Count of Tripoli
  Phoebus of Lusignan, Titular Marshal of Armenia and Titular Lord of Sidon (illegitimate)
  John of Lusignan, Titular Lord of Beirut (illegitimate)
  John of Lusignan, Titular Lord of Beirut (illegitimate)
 James I of Cyprus
 Janus of Cyprus
 James of Lusignan
  John II of Cyprus
 Charlotte, Queen of Cyprus
  James II of Cyprus (illegitimate)
  James III of Cyprus
 Philip of Lusignan, Constable of Cyprus
  Lancelot of Lusignan, Cardinal, Latin Patriarch of Jerusalem (illegitimate)
 Henry of Lusignan, Titular Prince of Galilee
  Illegitimate line (extinct 1660)
 Odo of Lusignan, Titular Seneschal of Jerusalem
 Hugues Lancelot de Lusignan, Cardinal Archbishop of Nicosia
  Guy of Lusignan, Constable of Cyprus
  Thomas of Cyprus

See also
Dukes of Aquitaine family tree

 
Frankish noble families